Craig y Cilau is a limestone escarpment in the Brecon Beacons National Park in Powys, Wales.

It was declared a national nature reserve in 1959 because of its importance for wildlife, particularly plants.

The range of habitats is equally wide with woodland and scrub in the lower parts and moorland higher up. There are numerous caves and disused quarries along the escarpment.

The limestone cliffs are home to many scarce plants including maiden pink (Dianthus deltoides), hutchinsia (Hornungia petraea) and the most southerly British population of alpine enchanter's nightshade (Circaea alpina). Five species of whitebeam occur including the narrow-leaved whitebeam (Sorbus leptophylla) and lesser whitebeam (Sorbus minima) which are endemic to Wales.

About 50 species of bird breed on the reserve including ring ouzel and raven on the cliffs and redstart, wood warbler and pied flycatcher in the woods. One of the caves, Agen Allwedd, holds a roost of lesser horseshoe bats during the winter months.

References
Condry, William M. (1990) The Natural History of Wales, Bloomsbury Books, London.
Saunders, David (1974) A guide to the birds of Wales, Constable, London.
Visit Mid Wales: Craig y Cilau. Accessed 3 March 2008.

External links 
Photos of Craig y Cilau and surrounding area on geograph

National nature reserves in Wales
Mountains and hills of Powys
Brecon Beacons